Pedicellate teeth are a tooth morphology today unique to modern amphibians, but also seen in a variety of extinct labyrinthodonts.  Pedicellate teeth consist of a tooth crown and a base (both composed of dentine) separated by a layer of uncalcified dentine.

Further reading

External links
 http://palaeo.gly.bris.ac.uk/Palaeofiles/Fossilgroups/Amphibia/characters.html

Amphibian anatomy